Borebi is a municipality in the state of São Paulo in Brazil. The population is 2,683 (2020 est.) in an area of 348 km². The elevation is 590m.

References

Municipalities in São Paulo (state)